Joshua Randall Stinson (born March 14, 1988) is an American former professional baseball pitcher. He played in Major League Baseball (MLB) for the New York Mets, Milwaukee Brewers and Baltimore Orioles.

Career
Prior to playing professionally, Stinson attended Northwood High School in Shreveport, Louisiana.

New York Mets
He was drafted by the New York Mets in the 37th round of the 2006 MLB draft and began his professional career that season.

He split 2006 between the GCL Mets and the Hagerstown Suns, going a combined 1–3 with a 1.79 ERA in 12 games (seven starts). In 2007, he pitched for the Savannah Sand Gnats and went 3–11 with a 4.86 ERA in 26 games (21 starts). With the Sand Gnats and St. Lucie Mets in 2008, Stinson posted a record of 3–8 with a 3.96 ERA in 28 games (eight starts). In 2009, he pitched for the Sand Gnats and St. Lucie Mets and went 5–3 with a 2.86 ERA in 50 games (only one start). He pitched for the Binghamton Mets and the Buffalo Bisons in 2010, going 11–5 with a 3.90 ERA in 36 games (18 starts).

Stinson made his major league debut on September 2, 2011 for the Mets against the Washington Nationals. He pitched  innings, giving up two hits and no runs. He also drew a walk in his first plate appearance.

Milwaukee Brewers
The Mets waived Stinson at the end of 2012 spring training, and he was claimed by the Milwaukee Brewers. He spent the 2012 season with Milwaukee's Double-A affiliate Huntsville Stars.

Oakland Athletics
Stinson was claimed off waivers by the Oakland Athletics on March 29, 2013.

Baltimore Orioles
On April 4, 2013, the Baltimore Orioles claimed Stinson off waivers, and optioned him to the Triple-A Norfolk Tides. He was recalled from the Class A Frederick Keys on April 24 to start against the Toronto Blue Jays. He was optioned to Norfolk after the game.

Stinson was recalled from Norfolk by the Orioles on August 17, 2013, and optioned back to Norfolk on August 19. He was recalled again on September 3 after the major league rosters expanded.

Stinson was outrighted to Triple-A Norfolk on May 1, 2014. He was added to the roster again on June 9. He was designated for assignment on June 17. Stinson elected free agency in October 2014.

Kia Tigers
Stinson signed a minor league deal with the Pittsburgh Pirates on October 23, 2014 but on December 29, 2014 he signed a one-year deal with the Kia Tigers of the KBO League.

References

External links

Living people
1988 births
New York Mets players
Milwaukee Brewers players
Baltimore Orioles players
Gulf Coast Mets players
Hagerstown Suns players
Savannah Sand Gnats players
St. Lucie Mets players
Binghamton Mets players
Buffalo Bisons (minor league) players
Norfolk Tides players
Frederick Keys players
Huntsville Stars players
Baseball players from Shreveport, Louisiana
Kia Tigers players
American expatriate baseball players in South Korea